F. Schumacher & Co. is a privately held company based in New York City and Fort Mill, South Carolina, that designs products for the interior design industry in the United States. Established in 1889 by Frederic Schumacher, F. Schumacher & Co. is a fifth generation business and the only supplier of decorative textiles from the 19th century still privately owned and managed by direct descendants of its founder. The company sells fabric, wall covering, trimming, floorcovering, finished goods, paint, as well as print media, social and digital platforms under five brands, Schumacher, Patterson Flynn Martin, Backdrop, Freddie and Frederic. F. Schumacher & Co. currently maintains 18 showrooms in several countries and sells to the interior design trade.

History

Beginnings (1889-1925)
Frederic Schumacher came to New York with the French textile company Passavant & Co. In the same year, he opened F. Schumacher & Co. at 22nd Street and Broadway on Manhattan's Ladies' Mile (now the Ladies' Mile Historic District). With the Gilded Age in full swing by 1893, Schumacher became a textile supplier and sold decorative fabrics to new American mansions and hotels, including the Waldorf-Astoria and the Vanderbilt.

In 1895, the company purchased a domestic fabric manufacturing facility, the Waverly Mill in Paterson, New Jersey. The Waverly Mill produced woven fabrics for residences, businesses and public buildings, including a satin lampas that Stanford White designed in 1902 for Theodore Roosevelt’s White House.

A modern approach (1925-1945)
In 1925, Schumacher took part in the Exposition Internationale des Arts Décoratifs et Industriels Modernes in Paris, an exhibition of Modern Art, a movement which inspired styles such as Art Nouveau and Art Deco. According to Jeffrey Simpson, who wrote in Architectural Digest in 2008, it is most likely that just before 1930 Pierre Pozier, nephew and heir of Frederic Schumacher, brought Poiret into the company as its first fashion luminary. At that time Poiret was asked to create the first designer fabric collection for the company. Poiret came up with simple Modernist shapes for his fabrics inspired by his contemporaries, Cubist painters.

By 1939, during the Great Depression and Second World War, the company contributed to the war effort by producing material for parachutes, life preserves, and other wartime products for the navy and air force. From 1939 until 1946, Schumacher's New Jersey-based mill, Waverly, operated 24 hours a day.

Post-war (1945-1970)

With rise in suburban communities and the American housewife, Waverly (a division of Schumacher, which was sold in 2007) marketed directly to the department store consumer and began advertising in print media in 1944 with the first slogan "all three," allowing customers to purchase fabric, wallpaper and carpeting in one place. 
In 1951, a custom-designed Liberty Bell and Liberty Cap were woven at the Schumacher mill for both the United States Senate and the House of Representatives. In 1950, First Lady Bess Truman selected fabric from F. Schumacher & Co. designed by Vera Neumann ) to decorate the White House's third-floor Solarium windows and upholstery.

In 1956, upon learning that many famous generals in history had been honored with a commemorative toile, Mrs. Eisenhower and decorator Elisabeth Draper devised a design from the buildings, trophies, and motifs that symbolized President Eisenhower’s life and career.  The pattern was even fashioned into a dress for Mrs. Eisenhower to wear during the president’s successful 1956 reelection campaign.

Schumacher’s Blue Room Lampas was featured in Jackie Kennedy’s famous TV tour of the White House, which aired in 1962.

Growth (1970-2021) 
In 1998, F. Schumacher & Co. acquired Patterson Flynn Martin, which was established in 1943 as a purveyor of fine Wilton and Axminster carpets from Europe, and authentic hand-made reproductions of traditional rug designs from the 16th, 17th and 18th centuries making it the sister company to Schumacher. Presently, it also focuses on making custom rugs for interior designers and architects

In 2021, F Schumacher & Co also went on to acquire Backdrop.

Today
F. Schumacher & Co. has 5 divisions that provide products and inspiration for interior decoration and design:

Schumacher 
Schumacher specializes in fabric, wallcovering, trim, furniture and home accessories.  It has a portfolio of over 10,000 products available for sale to interior designers and architects on fschumacher.com as well as in the 18 Schumacher showrooms in the United States:  New York, Boston, Washington D.C., Atlanta, Dania, Houston, Dallas, Minneapolis, Chicago, Troy, Los Angeles, Laguna Nigel, and San Francisco. Schumacher is also sold in 28 countries including Canada, Australia and the UK.

Patterson Flynn (PF) 
PF, the rug and carpet atelier, is a purveyor of luxury contemporary, traditional, transitional and statement hand-knotted, hand-woven, hand-tufted, hand-hooked and hand-coiled rugs, as well as Wilton broadloom and narrowloom carpets. In addition, PF has a design studio that helps clients make custom rugs in any shape, color, size, scale or construction. PF sells exclusively to the interior design trade and has nine showrooms across the United States in Atlanta, Boston, Chicago, Dallas, Dania, Laguna, Los Angeles, New York, and Washington D.C.

Backdrop 
Created by husband and wife duo Natalie & Caleb Ebel, Backdrop is The New Way to Paint. They offer premium, Green Wise certified and low-VOC paints that come in beautifully redesigned, award-winning paint cans, 12x 12’’ removable adhesive samples, the highest quality supplies, and a perfectly curated palette of 50+ colors. Since launch in November 2018, each Backdrop sale has contributed to the International Rescue Committee, which helps displaced families in some of the most challenging places in the world, and in 2020 Backdrop became the first Climate Neutral certified paint company.

Freddie 
Freddie is a membership experience designed for the architectural interiors community. Tehri mission is to empower and highlight the creativity and innovation of our industry by bringing the work, experience, and insights of interior designers to the public through our platforms including, digital first opportunities, brand building support and proprietary industry insights. At the same time, Freddie is a forum where member designers can connect with one another and learn to amplify and increase their business.

Frederic 
Led by Editor-in-Chief Dara Caponigro, Frederic is a lifestyle magazine filled with a range of topics that comprise the well-lived life—interior and garden design, architecture, entertaining, art, color trends, gift guides and more. Frederic is named after the visionary Frederic Schumacher, who founded F. Schumacher & Co in 1889.

Collaborations 
Schumacher released several collaborative collections with such designers as Cecil Beaton, Dorothy Draper, Vera Neumann, Frank Lloyd Wright, Joseph Frank, Saul Steinberg, Karl Lagerfeld, Jeremiah Goodman, Saul Steinberg, and Elsa Schiaparella. Many of the patterns in these collections are still available today along with reboot collections with the estates of Vera Neumann and Frank Lloyd Wright released in 2014 and 2018, respectively.

In addition to its proprietary products, Schumacher continues to collaborate on collections with artists, artisans, interior designers, architects and notable brands.  Current collaborators include: 

 Celerie Kemble
 Mary McDonald
 Timothy Corrigan
 Miles Redd
 Matthew Patrick Smyth
 Trina Turk
 Todd Romano
 Veere Grenney
 Studio Bon
 Caroline Z Hurley
 David Kaihoi
 Iksel Decorative Arts
 Mark D Sikes
 Vogue Living
 David Oliver
 Clements Ribeiro
 Charlap Hyman & Herrero
 Porter Teleo
 Stephanie Seal Brown
 Vera Neumann
 Frank Lloyd Wright
 Johnson Hartig
 Colette Cosentino
 Peg Norriss
 A Rum Fellow
 Molly Mahon
 Neisha Crosland

High-profile clients

Film industry

Set designer Hobe Erwin designed a line for Schumacher that was used to decorate the set for Gone With The Wind (1939). Cecil Beaton, society photographer and fashion designer for stage and screen — My Fair Lady and Gigi — was enlisted as a guest designer for F. Schumacher. In addition, sets for A Bed Time Story (1933), I Love Lucy (1953), The Age of Innocence (1993), Washington Square (1996), Atonement (2007) and others included Schumacher in their designs.

Government
The company has supplied textiles to the White House, the Chambers of the United States Supreme Court, and the Smithsonian Institution.

Public spaces
F. Schumacher was involved in the design of the Metropolitan Opera in New York City.

References

Interior design firms
American interior designers
Architecture firms based in New York City
Design companies of the United States
Design companies established in 1889
American companies established in 1889
1889 establishments in New York (state)